Erika Michelle Anderson (born January 28, 1982), better known by her stage name EMA, is an American singer and songwriter originally from South Dakota, now living for some years in Portland, Oregon. In her career beginnings, she released her debut album Little Sketches on Tape in 2010 on Night People, an independent music label founded by former Raccoo-oo-oon member Shawn Reed. In 2011 EMA released her second album Past Life Martyred Saints, which received positive reviews from Pitchfork Media, Drowned in Sound, and the NME. After releasing her debut album, EMA was named "New Band of the Day" by The Guardian and "Artist to Watch" by Rolling Stone. In 2011 she performed "Endless, Nameless" for Spins twentieth anniversary tribute to Nirvana's album Nevermind. Her song "The Grey Ship" was used on an episode of Adult Swim's Off the Air, and in the 2014 Carter Smith film Jamie Marks Is Dead.

The album The Future's Void was released on Matador Records in 2014. She made her network television debut performing on Late Show with David Letterman on August 26, 2014.

EMA released her third studio album, Exile in the Outer Ring, on August 25, 2017 through City Slang. The first single was "Aryan Nation" and dedicated to the people of "heartland America", where she is from. The single was inspired by the British skinhead film, This Is England.

Discography

Albums
 Little Sketches on Tape (Night People, 2010)
 Past Life Martyred Saints (Souterrain Transmissions, 2011)
 The Future's Void (Matador/City Slang, 2014)
 #Horror : Original Score by EMA (Matador, 2015)
 Exile in the Outer Ring (City Slang, August 25, 2017)

Singles
 "The Grey Ship/Kind Heart" (Souterrain Transmissions, 2011)
 "California" (Souterrain Transmissions, 2011)
 "Soul on Fire" (Hell, Yes!, 2011)
 "Milkman" (Souterrain Transmissions, 2011)
 "Marked/Angelo" (Souterrain Transmissions, 2011)
 "Take One Two" (Souterrain Transmissions, 2012)
 "Satellites" (City Slang, 2013)
 "So Blonde" (City Slang, 2014)
 "3Jane" (City Slang, 2014)
 "Active Shooter" (City Slang, 2015)
 "Amnesia Haze" (City Slang, 2015)
 "Aryan Nation" (City Slang, 2017)
 "Breathalyzer" (City Slang, 2017)
 "Down and Out" (City Slang, 2017)

References

External links
 
 Biography and review
 SF Appeal profile
 Pitchfork Media profile

1982 births
Living people
American women singer-songwriters
American women rock singers
American rock songwriters
American rock guitarists
Matador Records artists
Guitarists from South Dakota
21st-century American women singers
21st-century American singers
21st-century American women guitarists
21st-century American guitarists
City Slang artists
Singer-songwriters from South Dakota